Sir Alfred Gibbs Bourne  DSc (8 August 1859, Lowestoft – 14 July 1940, Dartmouth, Devon) was an English zoologist, botanist and educator who worked in India.

Life and work 

Bourne was the son of Rev. Alfred Bourne, secretary of the British Foreign School Society, and he joined the University College School after a liberal home education. Along with his contemporary Sydney J. Hickson, he was fascinated by the lectures of Ray Lankester. He later joined the University College in 1876 and attended the Royal School of Mines. In 1886, he went to Madras to join the Presidency College as Professor of Biology. He held this position until 1898 although he also held the positions of Registrar and Superintendent of the Madras Government Museum.

He was elected a Fellow of the Royal Society in 1895.

In 1903 he was made Director of Public Instruction and he worked on changes in the secondary education system, being responsible for the introduction of the Secondary School Leaving Certificate System. After his retirement, he took charge as director of the Indian Institute of Science, holding this position from 1915 to 1921. He was knighted as a Knight Commander of the Order of the Indian Empire in 1913.

He married Emily Tree Glaisher (or Glashier in some sources) in 1888. Lady Bourne (died 18 September 1954) was an acclaimed botanical artist and she teamed up with other artists at Kodaikanal to produce illustrations of the local flora. These illustrations were used in The Flora of the Nilgiri and Pulney Hill-tops by Philip Furley Fyson. A daughter married Stephen Cox of the Indian Forest Service.

References

1859 births
1940 deaths
People from Lowestoft
People educated at University College School
English zoologists
English botanists
Directors of the Indian Institute of Science
Fellows of the Royal Society
Academics of University College London
English knights
Knights Commander of the Order of the Indian Empire
Academic staff of Presidency College, Chennai